Tomás Lemos Araújo (born 16 May 2002) is a Portuguese professional footballer who plays as a defender for Gil Vicente, on loan from Benfica.

Career statistics

Club

Notes

Honours
Benfica
 UEFA Youth League: 2021–22

References

2002 births
People from Vila Nova de Famalicão
Sportspeople from Braga District
Living people
Portuguese footballers
Portugal youth international footballers
Association football defenders
S.L. Benfica B players
S.L. Benfica footballers
Gil Vicente F.C. players
Liga Portugal 2 players
Primeira Liga players